Hyloidichnus is a reptile ichnogenus commonly found in assemblages of ichnofossils dating to the Permian to Triassic in North America, Africa, South America, and Europe.

The animal that created the tracks was most likely from the subfamily Moradisaurinae, a group of lizard-like reptiles.

References

Reptile trace fossils